State Highway 39 (SH 39) is a State Highway in Kerala, India that starts in Perumbilavu and ends in Nilambur. The highway is 107.112 km long.

Route 
Perumbilavu – Koottanad - Pattambi – Perinthalmanna -Melattur–Karuvarakundu – Kalikavu – Nilambur Road

See also 
Roads in Kerala
List of State Highways in Kerala

References 

State Highways in Kerala
Roads in Palakkad district
Roads in Malappuram district